Peachfield is located in Westampton Township, Burlington County, New Jersey, United States. The house was built in 1725 and was added to the National Register of Historic Places on June 19, 1973.

The house is owned by The National Society of the Colonial Dames of America in the State of New Jersey and is operated as a historic house museum that is open for special events and by appointment.

See also
National Register of Historic Places listings in Burlington County, New Jersey
List of the oldest buildings in New Jersey

References

External links
 National Society of The Colonial Dames of America in the State of New Jersey

Houses on the National Register of Historic Places in New Jersey
Houses completed in 1725
Houses in Burlington County, New Jersey
Museums in Burlington County, New Jersey
Historic house museums in New Jersey
National Register of Historic Places in Burlington County, New Jersey
Stone houses in New Jersey
National Society of the Colonial Dames of America
1725 establishments in New Jersey
New Jersey Register of Historic Places
Westampton Township, New Jersey